Pedals  (died October 2016, New Jersey, United States) was an American black bear (Ursus americanus) that walked upright on its hind legs due to injuries on its front paws. After videos of the bear were posted on the internet, more than 300,000 people signed a petition to move the bear to a wildlife sanctuary. Pedals appears to have been killed in October 2016 in New Jersey's first sanctioned bow and arrow hunt in four decades. During the hunt, which also included muzzle-loading rifles, a total of 562 bears were killed.

Fame
Pedals was first spotted in 2014 in Oak Ridge, New Jersey. The bear walked upright on its hind legs due to injuries on its front paws. The bear's appearance spurred debate and discussions. Videos of Pedals' bipedal walking were posted to the internet and he was described as an "internet sensation". Officials initially warned that the videos may have been a hoax.

Over 300,000 people concerned with Pedals' welfare signed a petition written by Lisa Rose Rublack to relocate the bear to the Orphaned Wildlife Center in Otisville, New York. Supporters donated $22,000 to a fund created by Sabrina Pugsley to move the bear to the sanctuary to avoid the possibility of it struggling to survive in the wild. New York officials opposed the transfer of Pedals to the sanctuary.

Pedals was being monitored by the New Jersey Department of Environmental Protection's Division of Fish and Wildlife, which asked residents to report sightings by calling a hotline. In 2016, the Division asked the public to help with any sightings because the bear had not been seen since the previous Christmas.

Death
Pedals' internet fame led Angi Metler, director of the Bear Education and Resource Program, to believe he would be targeted by bear hunters.  In October 2016, reports of Pedals being killed by a hunter received widespread attention. On October 17, 2016, the New Jersey Department of Environmental Protection announced they believed Pedals had been killed during the officially sanctioned hunt. The October 10–15 hunt was New Jersey's first sanctioned bow and arrow hunt since the 1960s. During the hunt, which also permitted muzzle-loading rifles, a total of 562 bears were killed.

In response to the killing, State Senator Raymond Lesniak introduced a bill dubbed "Pedals' Law" that would ban black bear hunting in New Jersey for five years.

In December 2016, a hunter filed a defamation lawsuit in Morris County Superior Court alleging he was falsely accused on social media of being Pedals' killer, suffered death threats, and had his personal information published.

See also
 List of individual bears
 Bear hunting
 Rare 'big tusker' elephant killed by Leon Kachelhoffer

References

External links
 Video of Pedals using the bear's bipedal gait.

2014 in New Jersey
2016 animal deaths
2016 controversies in the United States
Ethology
Individual animals in the United States
Individual bears
Individual wild animals